General Parker may refer to:

Daniel Parker (general) (1782–1846), U.S. Army four-star general
Edwin P. Parker Jr. (1891–1983), U.S. Army major general
Ellis D. Parker (1932–2020), U.S. Army lieutenant general 
Ely S. Parker (1828–1895), U.S. Army brevet brigadier general
Frank Parker (general) (1872–1947), U.S. Army major general
George M. Parker (general) (1889–1968), U.S. Army major general
George Lane Parker (1724–1791), British Army lieutenant general 
Gervais Parker (1695–1750), British Army general of foot
James Parker (Medal of Honor) (1854–1934), U.S. Army major general
John Henry Parker (general) (1866–1942), U.S. Army brigadier general
Nick Parker (born 1954), British Army general
Robert W. Parker (general) (1960s–1990s), U.S. Air Force major general
Roy H. Parker (1890–1970), U.S. Army major general
Theodore W. Parker (1909–1994), U.S. Army four-star general
Thomas Parker (soldier, born 1753) (1753–1820), U.S. Army brigadier general

See also
Attorney General Parker (disambiguation)